Amanda Mynhardt (born 9 January 1986) is a South African netball player. She plays in the positions of GK and GD. She is currently captain of the South Africa national netball team and has competed in the 2010 Commonwealth Games in Delhi and the 2011 World Netball Championships in Singapore. She has also participated in the 2010 World Netball Series and the 2011 World Netball Series, both held in Liverpool, UK. In October 2012, she travelled with the Proteas to Australia & New Zealand to participate in the Quad-Series tournament, and in November 2012 she was a member of the Proteas Fast5 team in the 2012 Fast5 Netball World Series where she won a bronze medal.

In 2012, she travelled to New Zealand to play club netball. She was selected into the North NPC team, where she was coached by ex-Silver Ferns coach Yvonne Willering.

References
 Netball South Africa official player profile. Retrieved on 2011-11-29.
 Amanda Mynhardt player profile, Netball England website. Retrieved on 2011-11-29.
 Netball Court Specialists UK website. Retrieved on 2012-12-14.
 Netball South Africa site

South African netball players
Commonwealth Games competitors for South Africa
Netball players at the 2010 Commonwealth Games
1986 births
Living people
South African expatriate netball people in New Zealand
2011 World Netball Championships players